The New England Stars were a Tier III Junior "A" ice hockey team. The junior Stars played at the Skate 3 Arena located in Tyngsborough, Massachusetts, as members of the North American 3 Hockey League.

History
The Stars were originally members of the International Junior Hockey League and played in the New England Division of IJHL's Junior A Super Elite League until the 2011–12 season. In the 2012–13 season, the organization were founding members of the Northern States Junior Hockey League (NSHL) The team was owned by The Hockey Academy which also operates local youth teams at various levels, which eventually become the North American 3 Eastern Hockey League in 2014 after leaving the United Hockey Union and affiliating with the North American Hockey League and attained USA Hockey sanctioning in 2015. Prior to the 2016–17 season, the Stars became part of the North American 3 Hockey League (NA3HL) when it absorbed the NA3EHL.

Following the 2019–20 season, the NA3HL franchise was sold to the New Jersey Titans.

Statistics

Season records

References

External links
  Official Team Website
 Official League Website

2008 establishments in Massachusetts
2020 disestablishments in Massachusetts
Ice hockey clubs disestablished in 2020
Ice hockey clubs established in 2008
Ice hockey teams in Massachusetts
Junior ice hockey teams in the United States
Sports in Middlesex County, Massachusetts
Tyngsborough, Massachusetts